Our Lady of Jasna Gora Parish - designated for Polish immigrants in Clinton, Massachusetts, United States.

 Founded 1913. It is one of the Polish-American Roman Catholic parishes in New England in the Diocese of Worcester.
Merged July 1, 2010 to form St John the Guardian of Our Lady, Clinton.

School 
 St. Mary Elementary School, Clinton

Bibliography 
 
 The Official Catholic Directory in USA

External links 
  Our Lady of Jasna Gora Parish - ParishesOnline.com
 Our Lady of Jasna Gora Parish - TheCatholicDirectory.com
 Diocese of Worcester

Polish-American Roman Catholic parishes in Massachusetts
Religion in Worcester County, Massachusetts